Desulfovibrionales are a taxonomic order of bacteria belonging to the phylum Thermodesulfobacteriota, with four families. They are Gram-negative. The majority are sulfate-reducing, with the exception of Lawsonia and Bilophila. All members of this order are obligately anaerobic.  Most species are mesophilic, but some are moderate thermophiles.

Phylogeny
The currently accepted taxonomy is based on the List of Prokaryotic names with Standing in Nomenclature (LPSN) and National Center for Biotechnology Information (NCBI)

See also
 List of bacterial orders
 List of bacteria genera

References

External links 
 Desulfovibrionales - J.P. Euzéby: List of Prokaryotic names with Standing in Nomenclature

Desulfovibrionales